Old South Arabian is a Unicode block containing characters for writing the Minean, Sabaean, Qatabanian, Hadramite, and Himyaritic languages of Yemen from the 8th century BCE to the 6th century CE.

U+10A7D OLD SOUTH ARABIAN NUMBER ONE (𐩽) represents both the numeral one and a word divider.

History
The following Unicode-related documents record the purpose and process of defining specific characters in the Old South Arabian block:

References 

Unicode blocks